Jefferson Hall (born  6 December 1977) is an English actor. He has played the roles of Hugh of the Vale in Game of Thrones, Varg in Wizards vs Aliens on CBBC, Torstein in Vikings and as Aaron Korey in Halloween. He was credited as Robert Hall in his earlier roles. In 2022, he was cast as twins Jason Lannister and Tyland Lannister in the Game of Thrones prequel series, House of the Dragon.

History
Jefferson trained at the Royal Central School of Speech and Drama in London. He has had a varied TV and film career.

Filmography

Film

Television

References

External links

 Photo on Emma mini-series site, Jefferson Hall as 'Martin'
 blog on Game of Thrones Site

English male film actors
English male television actors
Living people
1977 births
21st-century English male actors
Actors from Coventry
Alumni of the Royal Central School of Speech and Drama